Patricia Ann Spearman (born 1955) is an American cleric, veteran, and Democratic politician from North Las Vegas, Nevada. She was elected in November 2012 to the Nevada Senate representing District 1, that is composed of the northern section of North Las Vegas and slivers of neighboring jurisdictions, after defeating incumbent John Jay Lee in the primary, and winning the general election. Spearman became the first openly lesbian member of the Nevada Legislature. She was re-elected in November 2016, and serves as co-majority whip since. Regarded as one of the most liberal members of the Nevada Senate, Spearman has introduced bills that provide equal pay for women, support LGBT rights, and support veterans. Spearman is also a supporter of the Equal Rights Amendment. Moreover, she was involved in the process of establishing the Nevada Revenue Plan during the 2015 session. On October 6, 2021, Spearman entered the 2022 race for Mayor of North Las Vegas, Nevada.

Before being elected senator, Spearman served in the United States Army for 29 years, reaching the rank of lieutenant colonel, was a pastor, and held several public service positions, including president of the school district of San Marcos, Texas.

Early life and career
Born in 1955 in Indianapolis, Indiana, Spearman was the daughter of a traveling evangelist. Because of that, she moved a lot during her childhood. Spearman earned a Bachelor of Arts in political science from Norfolk State University in Norfolk, Virginia, and attended the Episcopal Theological Seminary of the Southwest in Austin, Texas, where she graduated with a Master of Divinity (M.Div.). Moreover, she attended the Defense Equal Opportunity Management Institute and the U.S. Army Command and General Staff College, while serving in the army. When Spearman was running for Senate in 2012, she was pursuing a Doctor of Business Administration at Walden University, an online college.

Spearman spent 29 years (1977–2007) in the Military Police Corps of the United States Army, rising to the rank of lieutenant colonel. While serving in the military in 2004, she received the title Kentucky colonel. Furthermore, she held different public service positions in San Marcos, Texas in the 1980s and 1990s, starting as chair of the advisory council of a local district of the Department of Health and Human Services for two years. Thereafter, she was simultaneously member of the board of directors of a local charitable organization, member of the 17th Congressional District Selection Committee for Military Academies, and president of the San Marcos Consolidated Independent School District. She reached the board of the school district in 1991 after receiving 1,136 votes, and was chosen board president six months later. She did not seek re-election to a second term in 1994. In the early 1990s, she also served as pastor of the Jackson Chapel, a United Methodist church in San Marcos.

Between 2001 and 2005, Spearman served as faculty at the University of Louisville, where she was a lecturer in Pan American studies and director of the multicultural center. After moving to the Las Vegas Valley in 2005, she founded the Resurrection Faith Community Ministries, a church in North Las Vegas, and became pastor of the church. Spearman also volunteered for Barack Obama's presidential campaign in 2008, and was member of the advisory boards for Harry Reid and Steven Horsford in 2010 and 2011 respectively.

Nevada Senate

2012 election 
In 2012, Spearman challenged two-term incumbent Nevada Senator John Jay Lee, who was endorsed by the Senate Democratic Caucus, to represent the 1st district in the Nevada Senate. Spearman argued Lee was too moderate, since he opposed abortion and gay marriage. For that reason, she was supported by a coalition of liberal-leaning social and environmental groups. Spearman, who is lesbian herself, supported gay marriage and abortion. Furthermore, Spearman said Lee was not doing enough for his constituents. On her campaign website and in press releases, she stated she had worked as a professor at the University of Louisville, but the Las Vegas Review-Journal found out she technically had not been a professor. Lee criticized Spearman during his campaign for the falsehood, saying she was lying about her background in order to win the primary. Besides, Lee said that "[his] opponent [had] been encouraged to run by supporters of single issues like gay rights," and that the voters needed "the seniority and maturity of a senator."

Spearman won the primary, that was held on June 12, with 63% of the votes. She called it "a victory for the people." Spearman had spent about $12,000 on her primary campaign, which was only a fifteenth of the amount Lee had spent. However, an additional $80,000 was spent on her campaign by other political groups that were campaigning against Lee. An analysis by Lee's opponents, found out 54% of the voters were female, and a third of them had never voted in a primary before. During the general election, she was only challenged by Independent American Gregory Hughes, as no Republican had filed for the office. During the campaign for the general election, Spearman said it was important for Nevada to raise funding for education, since the current education system makes the state unattractive to new businesses and industries. She argued the wages of teachers had to be raised, and classes had to become smaller. In order to accomplish that, Spearman wanted to review the state's tax system. Spearman defeated her opponent on November 6 with 69% of the votes, having raised $108,000 for her general election campaign. Her term as a senator started the following day.

First term (2012-2016) 
During the 2013 regular session, Spearman sponsored multiple bills that passed the Legislature, including one that lists gender identity as a motivating factor for hate crimes. Besides, she supported a constitutional amendment to legalize gay marriage, and introduced an amendment to it that would allow religious organizations and clergy to refuse to marry people in order to take away concerns, and to guarantee religious protections. In May, Spearman supported an assembly bill extending the deadline for voter registration, arguing she knew as a veteran that it would help military personnel. The bill, however, was vetoed by Governor Brian Sandoval after being approved by both houses.

In 2014, multiple Democrats asked Spearman to run for governor as no popular Democrats filed for the office, but she decided not to do so. Later that year, the members of the Legislature convened for a special session in order to approve proposed tax abatements for Tesla Motors, that would then build a battery factory in Nevada. Although Spearman criticized the proposal, because it would eliminate a program that helped small businesses, she voted for it.

During the 2015 regular session, Spearman among other things introduced on behalf of absent Senator Debbie Smith a bill that would have prohibited people convicted of domestic violence and stalking to own guns. However, the bill did not pass the Legislature. Besides, she advocated legislation providing equal pay for women and minorities. Spearman did so rallying together with other Democrats in front of the Nevada Legislative Building surrounded by supporters. She argued another bill sponsored by Republican Michael Roberson did not go far enough, but later decided to support it in a bipartisan effort. It came no further than passing the Senate. She also tried to provide equal rights for women by introducing a senate joint resolution that would ratify the Equal Rights Amendment, an amendment to the U.S. Constitution, of which the ratification deadline had expired in 1982. The resolution never came to a vote.

Furthermore, Spearman helped establish the tax plan for the biennial budget. After Governor Sandoval had revealed his tax plan, Spearman introduced an alternative on March 17. Her tax plan would repeal the payroll tax (also called modified business tax), keep the business license fee at $200 for most companies, and impose a 0.47% gross receipts tax for businesses with a quarterly gross revenue of over $25,000. Spearman wanted to repeal the payroll tax in order to not punish the hiring of people. She said the plan was not meant to undermine the governor's plan, but to trigger debate, and to provide a choice. The Republican leadership proposed its own tax plan subsequently. Spearman voted in favor of the final plan, that combined all three plans, and was signed into law on June 9. The so-called Nevada Revenue Plan included Spearman's gross receipts tax (under the name Commerce Tax), but the conditions and rates differed: the tax has to be paid by businesses with a gross revenue of over $4 million, and the tax rates differ between 0.051% and 0.331% depending on the business sector. The Tax Foundation criticized such taxes, because they carry a pyramid effect – meaning that products are being taxed on multiple levels – and also tax loss-making businesses. That organization disapproved of the rates as well, since they are based on a one-year study of the economy of Texas.

In December 2015, a special session was called to give tax breaks to Faraday Future, that would in turn build a factory near North Las Vegas. Spearman voted in favor of the tax breaks, and called it a "watershed moment" for her constituents, as the area was hard hit by the recession. During the last year of her term, 2016, she organized a ceremony as a reaction to the Orlando nightclub shooting at the Gay and Lesbian Community Center of Southern Nevada. Later that year, Spearman was named member of the newly created New Energy Industry Task Force. The task force was created by Governor Sandoval in order to advise his administration on ways to promote renewable energy.

2016 election and second term 
Spearman sought re-election in 2016, when her first term ended. She was challenged by Republican Arsen Ter-Petrosyan, who had never run for office before. During the campaign season, Spearman supported presidential candidate Hillary Clinton, and held a speech at the Democratic National Convention on July 25, talking about LGBT rights, and saying how the Republican presidential ticket would threaten those rights. During her own campaign, Spearman said schools had to adapt to the available career opportunities. Moreover, she supported Ballot Question 2, a voter initiative to legalize cannabis. During a council meeting of the League of Women Voters of Las Vegas, she said she would introduce bills concerning equal pay, the ratification of the Equal Rights Amendment, and voter registration. She won the election, that was held on November 8, with 65% of the votes. She had raised over $235,000.

After her re-election, she became part of the leadership as co-majority whip together with Joyce Woodhouse.

Committee membership 
 2013 session:
 Senate Committee on Legislative Operations and Elections - chair
 Senate Committee on Government Affairs - vice chair
 Senate Committee on Transportation
 2015 session:
 Senate Committee on Commerce, Labor and Energy
 Senate Committee on Revenue and Economic Development
 Senate Committee on Health and Human Services (substituting for Debbie Smith when she was treated for a brain tumor)
 2017 session:
 Senate Committee on Health and Human Services - chair
 Senate Committee on Commerce, Labor and Energy - vice chair
 Senate Committee on Education
 2019 session:
 Senate Committee on Commerce and Labor - chair
 Senate Committee on Health and Human Services - vice chair
 Senate Committee on Growth and Infrastructure

Personal life
Spearman is African-American, and she was the first openly lesbian member of the Nevada Legislature. State senator David Parks was previously the only openly LGBT senator in Nevada. Two decades earlier – in 1992 – Spearman married Donald Brewington, who was a pastor as well, in San Antonio.

Electoral history

2012

2016

References

External links

 Profile at the Nevada Senate
 Campaign website

1955 births
21st-century American politicians
21st-century American women politicians
African-American female military personnel
African-American state legislators in Nevada
African-American United States Army personnel
American clergy
American LGBT military personnel
Equal Rights Amendment
Lesbian politicians
LGBT African Americans
LGBT Methodist clergy
LGBT state legislators in Nevada
Living people
Nevada Democrats
Norfolk State University alumni
People from North Las Vegas, Nevada
Politicians from Indianapolis
Politicians from San Marcos, Texas
Seminary of the Southwest alumni
United States Army officers
Women state legislators in Nevada